Skitz may refer to:

 DJ Skitz, a British DJ and music producer, sometimes referred to as simply Skitz
 Matt "Skitz" Sanders (born 1972), musician
 Nick Skitz, music producer